Montage is screenwriting software developed for Mac OS X. It allows the creation, editing, and management of screenplays on Macintosh computers. Montage can import Final Draft documents and text- and RTF-formatted files. It includes custom, pre-formatted templates for film, TV, and theater.

See also
Screenplay
Screenwriting

References

External links

AppleLinks Review

Screenwriting software
MacOS software